Hahn Island is an island  long, lying  north of Mount Discovery, on the east side of Koettlitz Glacier, in Antarctica. It was mapped by the United States Geological Survey from ground surveys and Navy air photos, and was named by the Advisory Committee on Antarctic Names in 1963 for Commander James Hahn, U.S. Navy, a public information officer on the staff of the Commander, U.S. Naval Support Force, Antarctica, for several years preceding 1963.

See also 
 List of antarctic and sub-antarctic islands

References

Islands of Victoria Land
Scott Coast